Abera is both a given name and a surname. Notable people with the name include:

Gezahegne Abera (born 1978), Ethiopian long-distance runner
Abera Kuma (born 1990), Ethiopian long-distance runner

Amharic-language names